Hyla is a genus of frogs in the tree frog family Hylidae. As traditionally defined, it was a wastebasket genus with more than 300 species found in Europe, Asia, Africa, and across the Americas. After a major revision of the family, most of these have been moved to other genera so that Hyla now only contains 17 extant (living) species from Europe, northern Africa and Asia. The earliest known fossil member of this genus is †Hyla swanstoni from the Eocene of Saskatchewan, Canada, but its designation to Hyla happened before the major revision, meaning that its position needs confirmation.

The genus was established by Josephus Nicolaus Laurenti in 1768. It was named after Hylas in Greek mythology, the companion of Hercules. The name is unusual in that – though Laurenti knew that Hylas was male – the name is unambiguously treated in the feminine grammatical gender for reasons unknown. 
The etymology of the name is also often incorrectly given as being derived from the Greek word  ("forest" or "wood").

Living species

Mating systems

Female choice based on male calling 
The mating systems across most species of Hyla largely feature female choice based on male calling effort. The specific parameter of calling effort that is selected for can vary from species to species, however. In H. versicolor, for example, females show preference for calls of longer duration. The selection of males which have calls of longer duration has shown to only be advantageous at low densities. This suggests that preference plasticity, based on environmental context, is beneficial. Comparatively, males of H. arborea achieve a higher rate of mating success with increased chorus attendance, that is the number of nights spent calling at a given breeding site. Moreover, increased chorus attendance carries with it a higher energy expenditure and risk of predation. Therefore, it may seem intuitive that males with higher chorus attendance are less likely to survive to the next breeding season. Conversely, these males are more likely to survive. This suggests that the fitness of these males is high enough to overcome the costs associated with chorus attendance. This provides evidence for chorus attendance as an indicator of mate quality in H. arborea.

Male-male contests 
Although it is studied less frequently than female choice, sexual selection influenced by male-male intrasexual competition does exist in certain species of Hyla. Males of H. versicolor produce conspicuous advertisement calls in large groups at territories known to females. This behavior, known as lekking, is common in many species of Hyla. In order to broadcast a clear acoustic communication to a female, males require distinct calling spaces within their respective leks. When males infringe upon the calling space of one another, aggressive interactions may occur. Males of H. versicolor may choose to lower costs of aggressive encounters by first assessing one another's resource holding potential. In simple terms, the resource holding potential (RHP) of an individual is its ability to win a fight. RHP can be based on a number of factors, including mass, size, weaponry, etc. In H. versicolor, the question of what determines an individual's RHP still stands. Aggressive interactions of this species are hard to observe within natural environments, because they occur briefly and infrequently. Research has suggested that RHP in this species is not based on body size, however these findings were not based on in situ observations, but instead on the findings of a manipulated experiment.

Indirect selection 

In terms of sexual selection, indirect selection refers to the selection of a specific trait based on its genetic correlation to overall fitness. H. arborea is a nocturnal species which depends on calling by males for female mate choice. In addition to its ability to detect acoustic communications, H. arborea, as well as most other Anuran species, possess specialized visual systems that function particularly well in low light. This visual system allows for detection of observable male traits that could factor into female mate choice. Research has shown that H. arborea females have a preference for males with more conspicuous vocal sac coloration. It is postulated that this preference may assist in localization and detection of males by searching females. However, vocal sac pigmentation is dictated by carotenoid levels, which must be ingested through food intake. Thus, the presence of conspicuous vocal sac coloration could in turn signal higher male foraging ability and fitness.

References

External links 

 . 2007. Amphibian Species of the World: an Online Reference. Version 5.1 (10 October 2007). Hyla. Electronic Database accessible at https://web.archive.org/web/20071024033938/http://research.amnh.org/herpetology/amphibia/index.php. American Museum of Natural History, New York, USA. (Accessed: Apr 21, 2008). 
  [web application]. 2008. Berkeley, California: Hyla. AmphibiaWeb, available at http://amphibiaweb.org/. (Accessed: Apr 21, 2008). 
  taxon Hyla at http://www.eol.org.

 
Hylinae
Amphibian genera
Taxa named by Josephus Nicolaus Laurenti